"Loveeeeeee Song" is a song by Barbadian recording artist Rihanna recorded for her seventh studio album Unapologetic (2012). The song features vocals by American rapper Future who also co-wrote, and music produced by Luney Tunez, Emmanuel Zaragoza (previously known as Mex Manny) and Future. Additional writing was done by Denisia "Blu June" Andrews and Rihanna herself.

"Loveeeeeee Song" is a sci-fi slow R&B song, that features lyrics the revolve around themes of love and affection that hear Rihanna singing in an accent.
"Loveeeeeee Song" received general acclaim, some of whom complimented Rihanna's vocals and called it a "stand-out track, while others called the song a "touching duet". It has since then peaked at number 55 on the US Billboard Hot 100 and charted on the R&B Chart at number 17 in the United Kingdom. The song is also included on the setlist of her Diamonds World Tour (2013).

Background
Rihanna began "working on the new sound" for her seventh studio album in March 2012, even though she had not yet begun recording. On September 12, 2012, Def Jam France announced via Twitter that Rihanna would release a new single the upcoming week while her seventh studio album was scheduled to be released in November 2012. However, the tweet was shortly deleted and replaced with another clarifying that "more information will be made available tomorrow, Thursday, September 13". Right after her performance at the iHeartRadio music festival in September 2012, Rihanna revealed that her single "Diamonds" would be released the same month. Via her official Twitter account, Rihanna posted a series of "teasing" tweets announcing her seventh studio album. On October 11, 2012, in one of her tweets she revealed that the title of her new album is Unapologetic.

Production and composition

"Loveeeeeee Song" is a "druggy slab of sci-fi" R&B song and is also the fifth track on the album. Co-producer Luney Tunez spoke about the process of working on it. In an interview with Complex he stated, "that was one of the beats I really don't like. It wasn't one of my favorites. When I made it, I was in the mindset of being real, melodic, laid back, and sexy." He further added that from the beginning he was aware that the song will be a "pop-female record" and that he also didn't want to put too many instruments in it. Luney Tunez labeled it as one of the favorite songs that he has ever produced.

In an interview for MTV News, Future spoke about collaborating with Rihanna, "They wanted a more uptempo record, so I sent four or five records, and I left the last record. It was more like a ballad, and I left it." He further revealed that the original title of the song was "Love & Affection", however, Rihanna's mentor Jay-Z changed it to "Love Song" and added two additional 'e's becoming "Loveee Song". Seth Firkins recorded the music for "Loveeeeeee Song" together with Future's vocals at Triangle Studios in Atlanta, Georgia. Rihanna's vocals were recorded by Marcus Tovar and Kuk Harrell at Westlake Recording Studios in Los Angeles, California, while it was mixed by Manny Marroquin at Larrabee Studios in Burbank, California. Harrell also handled production of Rihanna's vocals. All instrumentation and programming was carried out by Future who appears as courtesy of Epic Records.

The song starts with Future "slow-rolling track singing in his computerized drawl" the lyrics, "I don't want to give you the wrong impression, I need love and affection" and croons before Rihanna starts singing, "I want you now, I want you now." It ends with him saying "L O V E E E and affection". The song was composed in the key of B♭major and set in common time signature, and has a moderately fast tempo of 116 beats per minute. Rihanna and Future's vocals span from the low note of F3 to the high note of F5.

Critical reception
The song was met with critical acclaim. Caryn Ganz of Spin called the song a slow jam, while The New York Timess Jon Caramanica labeled it as striking and affecting duet. Shamika Sanders of Hello Beautiful called the song a "stand-out track" on the album and concluded that Future's rapping and singing vocals "find a nestled residence beside Rihanna’s sensual register. Together, they create a harmonious mixture of bedroom magic." According to Sarah H. Grant of Consequence of Sound "Loveeeeeee Song" is an "emotionally fragmented" and a "touching duet" with Future. Digital Spy's Robert Copsey wrote that the song is one of the few ballads on Unapologetic that can touch you deeper than the average slow songs. According to him, the reason for that are the circumstances with American entertainer Chris Brown which are felt through the whole album. In a review of Unapologetic, Alex Macpherson of Fact wrote that "Loveeeeeee Song" "is a boilerplate Future space ballad with an unforgivably stupid title."

Commercial performance
Following the release of Unapologetic, "Loveeeeeee Song" entered the US Billboard Hot 100 at number 100. It ascended to 88 its second week and to 63 in its third week. It additionally debuted at number 14 on the US Hot R&B/Hip-Hop Songs due to strong digital downloads. The song has also peaked at four on the Hot R&B/Hip-Hop Airplay chart. "Loveeeeeee Song" charted on the UK Hip Hop and R&B Singles Chart at number 17.

Credits and personnel
Recording
Recorded at Westlake Recording Studios, Los Angeles, California; Triangle Studios, Atlanta, Georgia.
Mixed at Larrabee Studios, Burbank, California.

Personnel

Vocals – Rihanna, & Future
Featured artist – Future
Songwriting – Nayvadius Wilburn, Denisea "Blu June" Andrews, Robyn Fenty
Production – Luney Tunez and E. Zaragoza p/k/a (Mex Manny) and Future
Future's performance recorded & engineered by – Seth Firkins

Vocal production – Kuk Harrell
Rihanna's Vocals recorded by – Kuk Harrell, & Marcos Tovar
Assistant engineer – Robert Cohen
Mixing – Manny Marroquin
All instruments and programming – Future

Credits adapted from the liner notes of Unapologetic, Def Jam Recordings, SRP Records.

Charts

Certifications

References

2012 songs
Rihanna songs
Contemporary R&B ballads
Future (rapper) songs
2010s ballads
Songs written by Rihanna
Songs written by Future (rapper)